Artemisia arenaria is a species of flowering plant in the family Asteraceae, native from Ukraine to Central Asia. It was first described by de Candolle in 1838.

References

arenaria

Plants described in 1838